Compsodes is a genus of hooded, sand cockroaches, of the subfamily Polyphaginae, in the family Polyphagidae.

References 

Cockroach genera